This is a list of assassinations which took place on the continent of Europe.

For the purposes of this article, an assassination is defined as the deliberate, premeditated murder of a prominent figure, often for religious or political reasons.

Albania

Austria

Belarus

Belgium

Bosnia and Herzegovina

Bulgaria

Croatia

Cyprus

Czech Republic

Denmark

Estonia

Finland

France

Georgia

Germany

Greece

Hungary

Iceland

Ireland

Italy

Kosovo

Latvia

Lithuania

Malta

Montenegro

Netherlands

Norway

Turkey

Poland

Portugal

Romania

Russia

Serbia

Slovakia

Spain

Sweden

Switzerland

United Kingdom

Ukraine

References

Europe
Assassinations in Europe
Assassinations
Murder in Europe